Ximena Alessandra Solís Zegarra (born 29 September 2001) is a Peruvian footballer who plays as a forward for the Peru women's national team.

International career
Solís represented Peru at two South American U-17 Women's Championship editions (2016 and 2018) and the 2017 Bolivarian Games. At senior level, she played the 2018 Copa América Femenina.

References

2001 births
Living people
Women's association football forwards
Peruvian women's footballers
Peru women's international footballers